Hicksbeachia pinnatifolia is a small tree in the family Proteaceae. This rare species is native to subtropical rainforest in New South Wales and Queensland in Australia. Common names include red bopple nut, monkey nut, red nut, beef nut, rose nut and ivory silky oak. The tree produces fleshy, red fruits during spring and summer. These contain edible seeds.

Taxonomy
Hicksbeachia pinnatifolia was first described by German-Australian botanist Ferdinand von Mueller in 1883 from a collection near the Tweed River in northern New South Wales.

Description
It may have additional stems rising from the base and suckers after being cleared. The leaf margins are lined with fine teeth. New growth is covered with fine rusty hair, as are the inflorescences that emerge in winter and spring (August to October). They have a strong sweet smell, described as sickly by some. The black seed is within the fruit, which does not fall away.

Distribution and habitat
Hicksbeachia pinnatifolia is found in (and on the margins of) subtropical rain forest from Tamborine Mountain in the southeastern corner of Queensland to the Nambucca Valley in on the New South Wales mid-north coast. It is a component of the understory.

Cultivation and uses
The seed is edible, though not as valued as that of its relative the macadamia. It is not commercially cultivated but is sometimes grown as an ornamental tree. It can be difficult to establish in the garden. Germination from fresh seed is reliable with a high percentage of success. However, many juveniles soon die of fungal disease. Alexander Floyd recommends adding original leaf litter from beneath the parent tree to promote beneficial anti-fungal micro-organisms.

References

Proteaceae
Proteales of Australia
Trees of Australia
Flora of New South Wales
Flora of Queensland
Ornamental trees
Taxa named by Ferdinand von Mueller
Edible nuts and seeds